Balance and Control is the second studio album by Irish band Scullion. It was released in 1980 by WEA. The album was produced by John Martyn.

Track listing

Personnel
Philip King - vocals
Sonny Condell - vocals, guitar
Greg Boland - acoustic and electric guitar

Additional personnel
Tommy Moore - bass
Jolyon Jackson - Fender Rhodes, polymoog
Andrew Boland - polymoog
Paul McAteer - drums

Release history

References

1980 albums
Scullion (group) albums